Oliver Mansour Jackson-Cohen (born 24 October 1986) is an English actor and model. He is best known for his role as Adrian Griffin in the 2020 adaptation of The Invisible Man and for his roles as Luke Crain and Peter Quint in the Netflix television programmes The Haunting of Hill House (2018) and The Haunting of Bly Manor (2020) respectively. He also had a recurring role in the 2013 television series Dracula.

Early life
Jackson-Cohen was born in Westminster, London. His mother, Betty Jackson, is a fashion designer, and his late father, David Cohen, was also his mother's business partner. His mother is English and from a Protestant background. His father was from an Orthodox Jewish family that moved to France in the 1950s; Jackson-Cohen has stated they were of Egyptian Jewish and Tunisian Jewish descent.

Jackson-Cohen attended a French-language school, and says he has a slight French accent.

He attended the Youngblood Theatre Company during weekends, then began washing vases for a florist as a job to financially support himself between auditions. He attended the Lee Strasberg Theatre and Film Institute in New York City due to not getting into drama school in London. His aim was to "do a foundational year and then reapply in London" but left after four months because he was offered a job.

Career
Jackson-Cohen landed a small role in the television series Hollyoaks when he was 15, and he later appeared in the ITV series The Time of Your Life in 2007. In 2008, he played Phillip White in the BBC adaptation of Lark Rise to Candleford and in the first episode of Bonekickers. He also played Marcus in the short film The Rooftopsmiths by Len Rowles with Natasha Freeman as Imogen and Philip Marden as Joel. In 2010, he played Damon in the romantic comedy film Going the Distance starring Drew Barrymore and Justin Long. and a hitman in the action film Faster, opposite Dwayne Johnson. In 2011, he starred as Prince William, Duke of Cambridge in a series of Funny or Die videos with Allison Williams as newlywed Kate Middleton. Jackson-Cohen starred opposite Cynthia Nixon in the miniseries World Without End as Ralph. He appears in Mr Selfridge with Jeremy Piven where he plays the role of Roddy Temple.

In 2013, Jackson-Cohen was cast as journalist Jonathan Harker in the NBC series Dracula. In 2014, he was cast as Misha in the film adaptation of Shamim Sarif's 2004 novel Despite the Falling Snow. In March 2014, Jackson-Cohen was cast as James, Duke of York in ITV's four-part period drama miniseries The Great Fire.

It was announced in July 2014 that he would star opposite Sarah Snook in the 2015 ABC convict miniseries The Secret River, an adaptation of Kate Grenville's 2005 novel of the same name. In 2015, Jackson-Cohen also starred in The Healer as Alec Bailey. In the same year, Jackson-Cohen was cast as Lucas in Emerald City, a television series that re-imagined the novel The Wonderful Wizard of Oz by L. Frank Baum.<ref>{{Cite web |title='Emerald Citys Reimagining Of 'The Wizard Of Oz' Is Deliciously Dark And Twisted |url=https://www.mtv.com/news/21kb8m/emerald-city-new-york-comic-con |access-date=2022-08-02 |website=MTV |language=en}}</ref> The series premiered in 2017 and was cancelled after one season. He then appeared in both seasons of the anthology web television series The Haunting. Both seasons of the series, The Haunting of Hill House and The Haunting of Bly Manor, received strong critical praise.

Jackson-Cohen next starred opposite Elisabeth Moss in the science fiction horror film The Invisible Man, portraying the titular role; the film was released in 2020 to positive reviews.  He later stated that the press tour for the film was difficult because it began just three days after his father had died.

In 2021, he appeared in the drama film The Lost Daughter, directed by Maggie Gyllenhaal. In 2022, he co-starred in the romantic regency comedy Mr. Malcolm's List, a film adaptation of the novel of the same name. In June 2021 it was announced that he would star in the upcoming Apple TV+ series Surface playing the character of James Ellis. The series premiered on 29 July 2022 to mixed critical reviews, though Jackson-Cohen's performance generally received critical praise.  On 2 December 2022, the show was renewed for a second season.

In June 2022 it was announced that Jackson-Cohen would star opposite Jenna Coleman in the upcoming Amazon Prime Video series Wilderness, a television adaptation of B.E. Jones's novel of the same name, which began filming summer 2022 in Canada, the UK and the US and wrapped in October 2022.

Personal life
Jackson-Cohen resides in London. In 2017 he stated in an Instagram post that he has been formally diagnosed with post-traumatic stress disorder stemming from childhood sexual abuse. His experiences informed his performance in The Haunting of Hill House: "I was diagnosed with PTSD a couple of years ago so all of that is in there with Luke - and it felt incredibly cathartic to be able to kind of put it all out there and be there."

He was in a relationship for several years with Jessica De Gouw, his Dracula'' co-star.

Filmography

Film

Television

References

External links
 

1986 births
21st-century English male actors
English male child actors
English male film actors
English male television actors
Jewish English male actors
Lee Strasberg Theatre and Film Institute alumni
Living people
Male actors from London
People from Westminster
21st-century British Jews
People with post-traumatic stress disorder
British people of Egyptian-Jewish descent
Sephardi Jews
Mizrahi Jews
British people of Tunisian-Jewish descent